This is the discography of American pop/R&B quartet En Vogue who began their career in early 1990s. Their discography includes seven studio albums, two EPs, 28 singles—four as featured artists, and 21 music videos on their former record labels Atlantic, East West, Elektra, Discretion, and 33rd Street.

En Vogue released their debut album Born to Sing in April 1990. It peaked at number twenty-one on the Billboard 200 and number 30 on the Canadian RPM Singles Chart, while reaching the third spot on Billboards R&B Albums chart. It was certified gold by the Recording Industry Association of America (RIAA) in June 1990 and 3× platinum by October that same year, and went gold in Canada. Within its first two years of release, it sold 3 million copies in the United States. The album produced four major single releases, including "Lies", "You Don't Have to Worry", and their debut song "Hold On", all of which peaked at number one on the Billboard Hot R&B Singles chart. The band's second album, Funky Divas, was released in March 1992. It debuted at number one on the US Top R&B Albums chart, and at number eight on the Billboard 200, while peaking at number four on the UK Albums Chart. It reached triple platinum status in the US, where it sold 5 million copies, becoming the seventh highest-selling R&B albums of the year as well as En Vogue's biggest-selling album to date. Funky Divas spawned five singles, including "My Lovin' (You're Never Gonna Get It)", Aretha Franklin cover "Giving Him Something He Can Feel", "Free Your Mind", "Give It Up, Turn It Loose," and "Love Don't Love You."

The group's third album, EV3, their first project as a trio following the departure of Dawn Robinson, was released in June 1997. In debuted at number eight on both the US Top R&B/Hip-Hop Albums and the Billboard 200 charts, marking the band's highest debut on both charts as well as their biggest first week sales yet. EV3 was awarded platinum by the Recording Industry Association of America (RIAA), indicating sales in excess of 1.0 million copies. Elsewhere, it entered the top forty on most charts it appeared on, reaching the top ten in Germany, Switzerland, and the United Kingdom. EV3 produced three hit singles, including platinum-selling hit single "Don't Let Go (Love)", as well as "Whatever" and "Too Gone, Too Long." Masterpiece Theatre, En Vogue's fourth album, was released in May 200. A commercial disappointment, it debuted and peaked at number 33 on the US Top R&B/Hip-Hop Albums chart and at number 67 on the Billboard 200, a considerable drop from their previous efforts. Internationally, the album failed to enter the top forty on the majority of the few charts it appeared on, through it reached number 22 and number 28 of the German and Swiss Albums Charts, where it ranks among the band's highest peaks in both countries. While first and only single "Riddle" became a top thirty hit in several European countries, Elektra Records refused to release further singles after the weak overall performance of the project, resulting in their departure from the label .

In October 2002, En Vogue's first holiday album The Gift of Christmas was released. Recorded along with Amanda Cole, it was produced and distributed through Discretion Records and featured four original songs and eight cover versions of Christmas standards and carols. The album failed to chart. In 2003, Cole left and new member Rhona Bennett was brought in during the recording process of sixth album Soul Flower, their debut with independent label 33rd Street Records. Upon its release, the album debuted at number 47 on the US Top R&B/Hip-Hop Albums and number 15 on the Independent Albums charts. In support of it, two singles, including "Losin' My Mind" and "Ooh Boy", were released. In 2005, the original members of the band briefly united before disassembling again. In 2009, they once again reunited for a concert tour, and though new material as a quartet was announced, Robinson and Jones again departed from En Vogue, with Bennett rejoining the group as a trio. In 2014, En Vogue signed to Pyramid Records and released the songs "Emotions", "A Thousand Times", and "O Holy Night", which were featured in the Lifetime movie An En Vogue Christmas. The band's seventh full-length studio album, Electric Café, was released on April 6, 2018, through eOne Music and En Vogue Records.

Albums

Studio albums

Compilation albums

Live albums

Extended plays

Singles

As main performer

As featured performer

Promotional singles

Album appearances

Music videos

Notes

References

Rhythm and blues discographies
Discographies of American artists
Pop music group discographies
Soul music discographies